Marionettes is the debut EP by Australian Hardcore band Mary Jane Kelly.

Track listing
 "Worthwhile Overdose" - 3:01   
 "L-O-V-E" - 3:33   
 "Hillcrest" - 2:19   
 "Soldiers IN Unmarked Graves" - 2:34   
 "My Son Optimus Prime" - 3:23

References

2007 EPs
Mary Jane Kelly (band) EPs